Mount Pool is a peak, 2,090 m, standing at the northwest side of Metavolcanic Mountain, at the east flank of Reedy Glacier. Mapped by United States Geological Survey (USGS) from surveys and U.S. Navy air photos, 1960–64. Named by Advisory Committee on Antarctic Names (US-ACAN) for Douglas A. Pool, construction electrician at Byrd Station in 1962.

Mountains of Marie Byrd Land